Mecyclothorax vaifaufa is a species of ground beetle in the subfamily Psydrinae. It was described by Perrault in 1989.

References

vaifaufa
Beetles described in 1989